Shieli is a district of Kyzylorda Region in southern Kazakhstan. The administrative center of the district is the urban-type settlement of Shieli. Population:   

Shieli district is located in the middle reaches of the ancient Syr Darya River. In the eastern side there are the ancient cities of Sighnaq, Bestam, known to all, in the southern side the ancient Karatau mountains stretch. Further, the Sarysu River, originating in the Arch and Telikul, is a witness to many historical events. The western part of the district is in contact with the regional center, and the northern part with Kyzylkum, famous for its winds.

References

Districts of Kazakhstan
Kyzylorda Region